Vreeland is a city in the Netherlands.

Vreeland may also refer to:

 Vreeland (surname)
 USS Vreeland (FF-1068)
 Vreeland House
 Vreeland Avenue (NYS&W station)